Loveboat is the ninth full-length studio album by British synth-pop group Erasure. Released in the UK by Mute Records in 2000, it was produced by Erasure and Flood. It proved to be their least successful in terms of sales and charts since their debut Wonderland in 1986. 

Erasure's US record label at the time, Maverick Records, shelved the album because of "lack of hit singles". Largely panned by Erasure fans upon its release (and even by Andy Bell years after) because of its greater use of acoustic guitars, its lo-fi feel and heavy-handed bass sounds (many blame Flood's production work), the album did manage to get some positive reviews from music critics.

Loveboat failed to hit the Top 40 in the UK and two singles were released, although only one was eligible to chart. Maverick Records requested the re-recording and remixing of several tracks from the album before they would agree to release it. Although "Moon & the Sky" was reworked, Maverick never released it and dropped Erasure from its artist roster. Three years after the album's UK release, Mute Records secured rights to finally release it in its original form in the US in 2003, after the release of Erasure's follow-up album Other People's Songs. Loveboat failed to chart on the Billboard 200.

The album's third single (along with "Freedom" and "Moon & the Sky") was supposed to be the fifth track, "Alien". It was talked about in several interviews at the time, and according to an interview there was even a music video made for the song where Andy and Vince are dressed in their clothes from the video for their 1986 single, "Sometimes". 

The CG model and cover artwork rendering was produced by Martin Gardiner.

Track listing
All tracks written by Andy Bell and Vince Clarke.

 "Freedom" – 3:09
 "Where in the World" – 3:46
 "Crying in the Rain" – 3:46
 "Perchance to Dream" – 4:35
 "Alien" – 4:32
 "Mad as We Are" – 3:50
 "Here in My Heart" – 3:43
 "Love Is the Rage" – 4:09
 "Catch 22" – 3:38
 "Moon & the Sky" – 4:22
 "Surreal" – 5:09

Release history

2016 "Erasure 30" 30th anniversary BMG reissue LP
Subsequent to their acquisition of Erasure's back catalog, and in anticipation of the band's 30th anniversary, BMG commissioned reissues of all previously released UK editions of Erasure albums up to and including 2007's Light at the End of the World. All titles were pressed and distributed by Play It Again Sam on 180-gram vinyl and shrinkwrapped with a custom anniversary sticker.

Charts

References

2000 albums
Erasure albums
Mute Records albums
Albums produced by Flood (producer)